Nicholas Orzio (November 12, 1928 - February 5, 2016) is an American photographer. He is known for his World War II photographs. He was inducted into the International Photography Hall of Fame in 1998.

References

American photographers
People from White Plains, New York
1928 births
2016 deaths